The 2006–07 Liga de Honra season was the 17th season of the competition and the 73rd season of recognised second-tier football in Portugal.

Promoted and relegated teams
These teams were relegated from the Liga betandwin.com at the start of the season:
 Gil Vicente (12th placed, instead of 15th placed Belenenses due to the use of a footballer – Mateus Galiano da Costa – who had played with the status of amateur and professional in the same year)
 Rio Ave (16th placed)
 Vitória de Guimarães (17th placed)
 Penafiel (18th placed)

These teams were promoted from the Second Division at the start of the season:
 Olivais e Moscavide (champions)
 Trofense (runners-up)

Final standings

Results

Footnotes

External links
Season on soccerway.com

Liga Portugal 2 seasons
Port
2006–07 in Portuguese football leagues